The Albufeira-Ferreiras Station is the railway station  for the city of , Algarve, in Portugal. Situated in the civil parish of Ferreiras, in the north of the municipality of Albufeira. The station opened on 1 July 1889.

Line 
The station is on the Linha do Algarve which runs east to west across the Algarve from Lagos in the west to Vila Real de Santo António in the east, on the border with Spain. Part of the line, between Tunes and Faro through Albufeira, is electrified, using overhead catenary. The line east of Faro to Vila Real de Santo António, is not electrified, nor is the western section between Tunes and Lagos. A scheme to electrify the whole line was due to have been completed in 2020, but so far little work has taken place.

Train service and station facilities

Albufeira - Ferreiras is a stop for long-distance trains between Faro and Lisbon. As of July 2021 there are five trains to and from Lisbon every day. This is the normal level of service. There may be extra trains on summer weekends. Local trains on the Algarve line between Lagos and Vila Real de Santo António also stop at Albufeira - Ferreiras. These trains are irregular and infrequent, operated by two coach diesel trains. There are nine trains in each direction on weekdays, seven on Saturdays and six on Sundays and Holidays.

The station is for passengers only, there is no freight facility. There is a staffed ticket office and waiting room. A footbridge with lift (elevator) connects the two platforms above the tracks. There are two café / bars at the station for refreshments.

Connections into Albufeira town

Taxis are available at the station. The journey into town will cost (July 2021) about €10. Uber and Bolt vehicles are also available. A local bus leaves the railway station every thirty minutes from 0700 until 2100 (winter), 2300 in summer. This bus ends its journey about 12 minutes later at the main bus station in Albufeira, which itself is 1.5 km (almost a mile) from the town centre and main hotel areas. Therefore, two buses will needed to reach most areas of Albufeira.

References

External links 

 https://www.cp.pt/passageiros/en/train-times - train times and tickets

Railway stations in Portugal
Railway stations opened in 1889
Albufeira
Albufeira